The Priest River is a  long tributary of the Pend Oreille River in the U.S. state of Idaho. It is part of the Columbia River basin, as the Pend Oreille River is a tributary of the Columbia River.

The river was named for a Roman Catholic priest, Father Roothaan.

Course
The Priest River originates in Upper Priest Lake and flows south into Priest Lake. It exits the south end of Priest Lake and flows south to the Pend Oreille River near the city of Priest River. The Upper Priest River, which is sometimes considered part of the Priest River proper, originates near the US-Canada border and flows south into Upper Priest Lake.

Tributaries
The Priest River has three major tributaries. On the left, there is the East River. This river has about twenty tributaries itself, and flows into the Priest about 1 mile from Big Creek. 
On the right there is the Upper West Branch of the Priest River, and the Lower West Branch of the Priest River. These never merge. The Lower West Branch is more popular, this has Torelle Falls on it.

List;
 Indian creek
 Lion creek
 Hunt creek
 Soldier creek 
 Quartz creek
 Upper west branch Priest River
 Lower west branch Priest River
 East River 
 Big creek
 Blue creek

See also

List of Idaho rivers
List of longest streams of Idaho
Tributaries of the Columbia River

References

Rivers of Idaho
Tributaries of the Columbia River
Rivers of Bonner County, Idaho